AYR is an Estonian Sidecarcross frame manufacturer, competing in the sports world championship.

The most prominent team in the 2008 world championship to use an AYR frame is the former world champions Kristers Sergis / Kaspars Stupelis. AYR has yet to win a world championship.

History

The company was formed by Are Kaurit, himself a former sidecarcross passenger. He started building frames with Jürgen Jakk in 1990 and, from 1996, with Ülo Ausmees.

Kaurit, together with Arvo Laksberg and later Jürgen Jakk, entered the world championship on an AYR frame, where he achieved seven top-ten finishes until 2004. From 2001, a number of other successful teams also used the frame. 

Ülo Ausmees was killed in a road accident in 2002 and AYR's production of sidecarcross frames came temporarily to a halt. The company recovered and continued to manufacture frames.

Sources
 The world championship on sidecarcross.com
 The official FIM website

References

External links
 AYR Racing Team website 

Sidecarcross